Fritz Bohla (born 11 January 1948 in Krostitz) is a former German football player and manager.

Bohla made a total of 51 appearances for BSG Energie Cottbus and 1. FC Union Berlin in the DDR-Oberliga during his playing career.

References 
 Fritz Bohla at immerunioner.de 

1948 births
Living people
People from Nordsachsen
East German footballers
Association football sweepers
1. FC Lokomotive Leipzig players
FC Energie Cottbus players
1. FC Union Berlin players
German football managers
East German football managers
FC Energie Cottbus managers
Tennis Borussia Berlin managers
Footballers from Saxony